Alexander Godfrey Macdonald, 7th Baron Macdonald, MBE (27 June 1909 – 1970) was a grandson of Ronald Bosville-Macdonald, 6th Baron Macdonald.

Born Alexander Godrey Bosville-Macdonald, he changed his surname to Macdonald on becoming Chief of the Name and Arms of Macdonald. On 14 June 1945, he married Anne Whitaker and they had three children:

Janet Ann Macdonald (born 2 November 1946)
Godfrey James Macdonald, 8th Baron Macdonald (born 28 November 1947)
Alexander Donald Archibald Macdonald (born 3 September 1953)

References
 Burke's Peerage, Baronetage & Knightage, 107th Edition, edited by Charles Mosley, Wilmington, Delaware, 2003, vol II, pp. 2474–2475, 

1909 births
1970 deaths
Alumni of Magdalene College, Cambridge
Lord-Lieutenants of Inverness-shire
Members of the Order of the British Empire
7